Radlkoferotoma is a genus of South American flowering plants in the family Asteraceae.

The genus name of Radlkoferotoma is in honour of Ludwig Adolph Timotheus Radlkofer (1829–1927), a Bavarian taxonomist and botanist. 
It was first described and published in Revis. Gen. Pl. Vol.1 on page 358 in 1891.

 Species
 Radlkoferotoma berroi (Hutch.) R.M.King & H.Rob. - Uruguay, Rio Grande do Sul 
 Radlkoferotoma cistifolia (Less.) Kuntze - Uruguay, Brazil
 Radlkoferotoma ramboi (Cabrera) R.M.King & H.Rob. -  Rio Grande do Sul

References

Asteraceae genera
Eupatorieae
Flora of South America
Plants described in 1891